Camille Izabel Policarpio Clarin (born May 28, 2001) is a Filipino-Canadian college basketball player. She plays for the NU Lady Bulldogs and also represents the Philippine national team in international competitions.

Early life 
Clarin was born in Antipolo, Rizal, but grew up in Canada. She first played basketball at the age of 10. She had to play in all-boys leagues to get better in her sport. Aside from basketball, she also was a swimmer and a figure skater. As she grew older, she played in the Ontario Basketball Association (OBA).

Clarin then played for Blair Academy in New Jersey. At age 15, she tore her anterior cruciate ligament (ACL) going up for a layup while playing in the Filipino Basketball Association of North America (FBA-NA) tournament. She spent most of her sophomore season recuperating. She became a three-time Mid-Atlantic Prep League champion in her time there. In her senior year, she broke her own school record by hitting 11 three-pointers (10 was her previous record set earlier).

College career 
Clarin plays for the NU Lady Bulldogs, the women's team of the National University (NU), in the UAAP. She was originally going to play for Hamilton, a Division III college. Instead, she came to the Philippines and played for NU. Her rookie season was in 2019. That season, she helped the Lady Bulldogs extend their winning streak to 96 games and win their sixth straight championship. She was also given an Athlete Scholar award at the end of Season 82.

In Season 84, she helped NU claim a three-peat in 3x3 basketball.

In Season 85, she was part of the NU squad that won their 100th straight game. Their streak ended at 108 games in a loss to the De La Salle Green Archers, their first in nine seasons. They were able to win their seventh straight championship that season, tying them with the UE Red Warriors for most consecutive championships in the league.

National team career 
In 2019, Clarin made a game-winning putback for the win over the Netherlands in the 2019 Fiba 3x3 Under-18 World Cup. Then, they beat Czech Republic in overtime. Their run ended when they lost in the quarterfinals to China. Later that year, they beat China in the FIBA Women’s 3×3 Under-18 Asian Championship to claim bronze.

Clarin first played for the senior team in 2021 for that year's FIBA Women's Asia Cup. She won her first SEA Games gold medal in 2022 for women's 5x5 basketball. That same year, she also competed in the 2022 FIBA Asia 3x3 Cup. They failed to make it to the main draw after a loss to Thailand and were eliminated early.

Personal life 
Clarin is currently in a relationship with Shaun Ildefonso, a PBA player. They met while they were both playing for NU.

Clarin is an analyst for the Philippine edition of NBA.com. She also hosts NBA Hype on Cignal TV. She is also an endorser for Nike and Milo Drink.

Clarin has cited NBA and WNBA 3-point champions Ray Allen, Allie Quigley, and Klay Thompson as players she looks up to.

References

External links 

 Camille Clarin on Instagram
 Camille Clarin on Twitter
 Profile at FIBA website

Living people
Filipino women's basketball players
Philippines women's national basketball team players
Power forwards (basketball)
Small forwards
Southeast Asian Games medalists in basketball
Southeast Asian Games gold medalists for the Philippines
Southeast Asian Games competitors for the Philippines
NU Lady Bulldogs basketball players
Competitors at the 2021 Southeast Asian Games
2001 births
People from Antipolo
Canadian women's basketball players
Citizens of the Philippines through descent
Canadian sportspeople of Filipino descent